General Sahir Shamshad Mirza  is a four-star rank general in Pakistan Army, currently serving as the 18th Chairman Joint Chiefs of Staff Committee appointed to the post on 27 November 2022. Prior to his appointment as Commander of X Corps at Rawalpindi, he previously served as 35th Chief of General Staff until succeeded by Azhar Abbas.

He was commissioned in the 8th battalion of the Sind Regiment. In March 2018, he was awarded the Hilal-i-Imtiaz (Military) by Pakistan's President. His previous assignments includes Adjutant General at the General Headquarters until November 2019 and Director General for Military Operations. During his assignment at Military Operations, he commanded 40th Infantry Division in Okara.

On December 8, 2022, Gen Sahir Shamshad Mirza received the Nishan-i-Imtiaz (Military) award from President Arif Alvi. At the Aiwan-e-Sadr, the top military officials were given special investitures in front of Prime Minister Shehbaz Sharif, diplomats, lawmakers, and federal ministers were present during the ceremony.

Commands Held
 GOC, 40 Infantry Division, Okara
 February 2015 - September 2015 
Preceded By: Maj Gen 
Succeeded By: Maj Gen Abid Mumtaz 
 Director General Military Operations 
 September 2015 - October 2018 
Preceded By: Maj Gen (Later Lt Gen) Aamer Riaz 
Succeeded By: Maj Gen (Now LTG) Nauman Zakaria 
 Vice Chief of General Staff - Alpha
 October 2018 - June 2019 
Preceded By: Maj Gen (Later LTG) Shaheen Mazhar Mehmood 
Succeeded By: Maj Gen (now LTG) Muhammad Asim Malik 
 Adjutant General
 June 2019 - November 2019 
Preceded By: Lt Gen Faiz Hameed 
Succeeded By: Lt Gen Muhammad Aamer 
 CGS
 June 2019 - September 2021
Preceded By: Lt Gen Nadeem Raza 
Succeeded By: Lt Gen Azhar Abbas 
 Commander, X Corps, Rawalpindi
 September 2021 - 26 Nov 2022 
Preceded By: Lt Gen Azhar Abbas 
Succeeded By: - Lt. Gen Shahid Imtiaz

Awards and decorations

Foreign decorations

Dates of Rank

References 

Living people
Date of birth missing (living people)
Place of birth missing (living people)
Pakistan Army officers
Pakistani generals
Year of birth missing (living people)